In mathematics, a subadditive set function is a set function whose value, informally, has the property that the value of function on the union of two sets is at most the sum of values of the function on each of the sets. This is thematically related to the subadditivity property of real-valued functions.

Definition 

Examples of subadditive functions 

Every non-negative submodular set function is subadditive (the family of non-negative submodular functions is strictly contained in the family of subadditive functions).

The function that counts the number of sets required to cover a given set is subadditive. Let  such that . Define  as the minimum number of subsets required to cover a given set. Formally,  is the minimum number  such that there are sets  satisfying . Then  is subadditive.

The maximum of additive set functions is subadditive (dually, the minimum of additive functions is superadditive). Formally, for each , let  be additive set functions. Then  is a subadditive set function.

Fractionally subadditive set functions are a generalization of submodular functions and a special case of subadditive functions. A subadditive function  is furthermore fractionally subadditive if it satisfies the following definition. For every , every , and every , if , then . The set of fractionally subadditive functions equals the set of functions that can be expressed as the maximum of additive functions, as in the example in the previous paragraph.

See also 
 Submodular set function
 Utility functions on indivisible goods

Citations 

Combinatorial optimization
Approximation algorithms